ULS can refer to:
 Uganda Law Society
 Ultimate Limit State
 Unduly lenient sentence
 Universal Licensing System of US FCC
 University Laboratory School
 University Lake School
 University of La Serena
 University Liggett School
 Upward looking sonar
 User Location Service
 Uttara Lanka Sabhagaya, political alliance in Sri Lanka